Mick Dodge (born August 29, 1951), also known as "The Barefoot Sensei", "the Barefooted  Nomad" and "Walking Mountain" is a television personality and rainforest-dweller in Washington.

Early life
Dodge is a native of the Olympic Peninsula. great-grandparents settled in the region and Dodge grew up there as a child. He loved the outdoors. Dodge also lived in many other places around the country and the world as the son of a career Marine, Ronald L. Dodge. The younger Dodge graduated from high school in Okinawa, Japan. He enlisted in the Marine Corps and served for six years.

In the forest
In 1991, Dodge decided to leave the modern world and retreat to the dense forest due to the stress of modern living. He has remained in the forest for over 30 years, typically only ever re-entering the public as a last resort for serious medical emergencies.

EarthGym program
Despite the preference to be separated from modern civilization, Dodge is still involved with the community. In 1994, he and Jacquie Chandler created an earth-based fitness program they called The EarthGym,  a fitness program in the forest where nature provides most of the equipment for physical training.

Media
Dodge is the subject of the National Geographic Channel reality TV series The Legend of Mick Dodge, about his unusual life dwelling in a forest.

References

Living people
Survivalists
United States Marines
Year of birth missing (living people)